George Bartholomew Weeks (5 August 1902 – 28 June 1982) was an English footballer who played as a full back in the Football League for Brentford and Watford.

Career statistics

References

Association football fullbacks
Southall F.C. players
Watford F.C. players
Brentford F.C. players
English Football League players
Dagenham F.C. players
1902 births
1982 deaths
Footballers from Poplar, London
English footballers